Chipaw Marka (Hispanicized spelling Chipaomarca) is an archaeological site in Peru. It was declared a National Cultural Heritage in 2003. Chipaw Marka lies in the Ayacucho Region, Lucanas Province, Chipao District.

References 

Archaeological sites in Peru
Archaeological sites in Ayacucho Region